Khalid Boulami (born Safi, Morocco, August 7, 1969) is a Moroccan long distance runner who won a bronze medal in the 5000 metres at the 1996 Olympic Games in Atlanta.  

At the World Championships, he won two silver medals in the 5000 metres in 1995 and 1997. 

He is the older brother of Brahim Boulami.

Personal bests
3000 metres - 7:30.99 (1997)
5000 metres - 12:53.41 (1997)
2 miles - 8:10.98 (1996)
3000 metres steeplechase - 8:24.21  (1995)
10,000 metres - 28:48.43 (1994)
10 km - 27:17 (1993)
20 km - 59:05 (1993)

International competitions
1997 World Championships in Athletics - silver medal (5000 m)
1997 IAAF Grand Prix Final - gold medal (5000 m) 
1996 Summer Olympics - bronze medal (5000 m)
1995 World Championships in Athletics - silver medal (5000 m)
1995 IAAF Grand Prix Final - bronze medal (3000 m) 
1994 IAAF Grand Prix Final - silver medal (5000 m) 
1994 Jeux de la Francophonie - bronze medal (10.000 m)

External links 
 
 
 

1969 births
Living people
People from Safi, Morocco
Moroccan male long-distance runners
Olympic athletes of Morocco
Olympic bronze medalists for Morocco
Athletes (track and field) at the 1996 Summer Olympics
World Athletics Championships athletes for Morocco
World Athletics Championships medalists
Medalists at the 1996 Summer Olympics
Olympic bronze medalists in athletics (track and field)
Goodwill Games medalists in athletics
Mediterranean Games bronze medalists for Morocco
Mediterranean Games medalists in athletics
Athletes (track and field) at the 1991 Mediterranean Games
Competitors at the 1998 Goodwill Games